Ionopsidium is a genus of plants in the family Brassicaceae, endemic to the western Mediterranean region.

Species

References

 

Brassicaceae
Brassicaceae genera